Bachelor's degree or higher is a commonly used term by the United States Census Bureau and other U.S. government agencies on the federal as well as state and local level. The term describes the portion of the population that has either a bachelor's degree or a higher degree such as a master's or doctorate degree. In 2017, 33.4% of the population over 25 years old in the United States had a bachelor's degree or higher.

The term is sometimes used as a synonym for "college graduate" as it includes not only those with a bachelor's degree but all others who have completed a degree requiring more than four years of credits. While the term is sometimes used interchangeably with the term college graduate, it excludes those with an associate degree, as this college degree only requires two years' worth of units and is thus lower than bachelor's degree.

See also
Educational attainment in the United States
Education in the United States
Academic degree
Associates degree
Bachelor's degree
Master's degree
Doctorate degree

References

Higher education in the United States